Franciscus Lamar Mills (born January 26, 1971) is a former American football defensive tackle in the National Football League for the Washington Redskins.  He played college football at Indiana University and high school football at Detroit St. Martin de Porres.

1971 births
Living people
Saint Martin de Porres High School (Detroit) alumni
American football defensive tackles
Indiana Hoosiers football players
Washington Redskins players
Amsterdam Admirals players
Players of American football from Detroit